Adam Augustus Wylie (born May 23, 1984) is an American actor, magician and a former Crayola spokesman. Wylie is known most for playing Zack Brock, the youngest son of Doctor and Sheriff Brock's children, on Picket Fences from 1992 to 1996.

Early life
Wylie was born in San Dimas, California, the son of Karen and Leonard Wylie. He is one of five children, including brothers Eric, Ben, Aaron, and sister, Tai. He started his acting career at the age of four in a candy commercial. He attended Upland Christian Schools in Upland, California and Condit Elementary in Claremont, California.

Career

Voice-over work
By the age of nine, he was busy with voice-over work, including the voice of young Prince Derek in The Swan Princess (1994), and David in All Dogs Go to Heaven 2 (1996). He then lent his voice to many animated series, including Dennis the Menace as the title character (1993–94), Hey Arnold! as Curly (1996–2002), Crayola Kids Adventures, Napoleon as the title character (1997), The King and I (1999) as Louis Leonowens, and Walt Disney Television Animation's pilot Kitty's Dish (as Josh). Wylie's voice credits also include Batman Beyond, Pepper Ann as Crash, As Told By Ginger as Ian Richton, Midnight Club II, Jimmy Olsen in the 2007 direct-to-DVD film, Superman: Doomsday, the roles of Fred Nerk, Nigel Thrall and Bananas B on American Dragon: Jake Long, Avatar: The Last Airbender, Ben 10, and the character Justin in The Easter StoryKeepers.

He also starred as Mike Fowler in Focus on the Family's The Last Chance Detectives audio cases (2004).

Wylie also starred as the voice of Brainiac 5 and Colossal Boy in the animated television show Legion of Super Heroes and the voice of Ulraj in the Secret Saturdays.

Wylie voiced the lead role in Sir Malcolm and the Missing Prince, the first series in Lamplighter Publishing's new radio drama Lamplighter Theatre. This radio drama is a two-hour production.

He also voices Ryan Cummings in the popular Christian audio drama series Adventures in Odyssey.

From 2012 to 2013, Wylie voiced Tritannus, the main antagonist in the fifth season of Winx Club.

Television and film work
In 1993, he voiced Timmy and Chris on cartoon Christmas film Precious Moments: Timmy's Special Delivery. In 1994, he did one of the characters on the Easter film Precious Moments: Simon the Lamb. Wylie first became widely known as Zack Brock, the youngest of Sheriff Brock's three children in the television series Picket Fences from 1992 to 1996. This was followed by appearances in many other television programs, including as a series regular in Love and Marriage as Max, Ed as David Mirsky (2001), and Gilmore Girls as Brad Langford (2001–2003), he played Garfield in The Biggest Fan (2002) and as a guest star in 7th Heaven as Marvin, Sliders as Trevor, Touched by an Angel as Andy Erskine, Judging Amy as Nicholas Binkow, MTV Undressed as Owen, Entourage, Living Single, Monk, CSI: Miami, and Veronica Mars.

Wylie was cast as Garfield (Debbie Warden's older brother) in the Dream Street film The Biggest Fan.

Wylie also appeared in the television films Under Wraps as Gilbert, Out on a Limb, Balloon Farm as Charles, and Michael Landon, the Father I Knew as the best friend to the television star's teenage son.

Wylie's first motion picture appearance was in Child's Play 2 (1990), which was followed by roles in films including Kindergarten Cop as Larry (1990), Santa With Muscles (1996), Children of the Corn V: Fields of Terror as Ezekial (1998), Breaking Free as Billy (1995), Cutaway as Cal (2000), Can of Worms as Nick (1999), Flying Virus as Adam (2001), Daybreak as Newton Warner (2001), Rebound (2005), and American Pie Presents: Band Camp as Guy (2005). He also starred in several Crayola Kids' Club-produced films.

Wylie played Mikey in the 2009 skateboarding film Street Dreams.

In 2009, Wylie was seen performing card tricks & coin tricks on syndicated magic show "Masters of Illusion."

In 2010 he had a small part as a cop opposite Kelly Monaco's character Sam McCall on General Hospital.

Also in 2012, he guest starred as Andy the Android on Disney Channel's Shake It Up: Made in Japan and was in love with a Talking Toilet he named ToyToy.

Musical theatre
In 2002, Wylie appeared as Jack in Stephen Sondheim's Tony Award-winning revival of Into the Woods on Broadway. 
 His role in Into the Woods was meta-referenced on Gilmore Girls as being done by his character in that series, Brad Langford.

He has also appeared frequently in regional theatre, including in Camelot as Merlyn-Tom-Morgan at the North Shore Music Theatre (Massachusetts) in 2005, Big River as Huck Finn, 110 in the Shade as Jimmy Curry in 2004 at the Pasadena Playhouse (California), On the Town as Chip in 2003 at the Gateway Playhouse, Bellport, New York, Footloose as Willard, Precious Sons as Freddie Jr., House Arrest as Todd, and Beauty and the Beast, as Chip. He also played Leo Bloom in a regional production of Mel Brooks' The Producers (musical) at Gateway Playhouse.

February 21, 2007 marked Wylie's debut in the musical Wicked at the Pantages Theatre, Los Angeles. He starred as Boq opposite such stars as Eden Espinosa, Jenna Leigh Green, Megan Hilty, and Carol Kane. He played his final performance on December 30, 2007, along with Espinosa and Kane, and was replaced by his understudy, Michael Drolet.

Honors and awards
Wylie won Young Artist Awards for Picket Fences, and Dennis the Menace, and Hollywood Reporter YoungStar Awards for Picket Fences twice. He has been nominated for Young Artist Awards for Under Wraps, and All Dogs Go to Heaven 2, and YoungStar Awards for Balloon Farm, and Michael Landon, The Father I Knew.

Filmography

Film

Television

Television films

Theatre

Other appearances

References

External links
 Website
 Profile at UK Movies.com
 Profile at Filmbug.com
 

1984 births
Living people
American magicians
American male child actors
American male film actors
American male musical theatre actors
American male television actors
American male voice actors
People from San Dimas, California